Wolf Creek is a tributary of the North Canadian River in Texas and Oklahoma in the United States. It begins in Ochiltree County, Texas, and flows generally westward and northwestward through Lipscomb and Ellis counties into Woodward County, Oklahoma, where it joins the Beaver River to form the North Canadian River.

The creek is dammed in Woodward County to form Fort Supply Lake.

See also
List of rivers of Oklahoma
List of rivers of Texas

References

Rivers of Oklahoma
Rivers of Texas
Rivers of Ochiltree County, Texas
Rivers of Lipscomb County, Texas
Rivers of Ellis County, Texas
Rivers of Woodward County, Oklahoma